Lil Miss Hot Mess (born  1984) is an American drag queen, activist, and children’s book author, known for her work with the #MyNameIs campaign and Drag Queen Story Hour.

Career 

Lil Miss Hot Mess began performing in San Francisco in 2008 at The Stud.  In 2010, at the age of 26, she threw herself a "Bat Mitzvah x2" and later that year won the inaugural title of Tiara Sensation, hosted by Club Some Thing.

In 2014, Lil Miss Hot Mess co-founded the #MyNameIs campaign alongside other drag performers (including as Sister Roma and Alex U. Inn), as well as LGBTQ and BIPOC activists, sexual violence survivors, and privacy advocates to protest Facebook’s real-name policy.  The group met with and protested Facebook leadership, claiming that the platform prevented users from being their authentic selves and maintaining their privacy.  In a piece for Salon, Lil Miss Hot Mess wrote:

In 2017, Lil Miss Hot Mess appeared on Saturday Night Live as a backup dancer for Katy Perry, with a group of drag and ballroom performers including Indya Moore, Brita Filter, Scarlet Envy, and Vivacious.

Lil Miss Hot Mess also appeared in a 2020 Biden-Harris campaign video to the tune of "America the Beautiful."

Outside of her drag career, Lil Miss Hot Mess is a university professor, and she holds a PhD from NYU.  She has published in academic journals on subjects like “drag pedagogy” and digital drag performance.

Drag Queen Story Hour 

In 2016, Lil Miss Hot Mess became involved for Drag Queen Story Hour as one of the first queens to read for the group in New York City.  She has since performed Drag Queen Story Hour readings at venues like the Brooklyn Public Library, Institute for Contemporary Arts Los Angeles, and HBO’s Human By Orientation digital platform.

In 2020, she published a children’s book called The Hips on the Drag Queen Go Swish, Swish, Swish, illustrated by Olga de Dios and published by Running Press Kids.  The book received positive reviews, including Kirkus Reviews, which described it as “a fun, movement-filled, family-friendly celebration of drag.”  In an interview, Lil Miss Hot Mess described her goal behind writing the book as:

The Hips on the Drag Queen Go Swish, Swish, Swish was also featured as a favorite by Jesse Tyler Ferguson on The Ellen DeGeneres Show, as a book he likes to read to his son.

In 2021, Lil Miss Hot Mess read The Hips on the Drag Queen Go Swish, Swish, Swish in a segment of the television show Let’s Learn, produced by New York City PBS affiliate WNET and the New York City Department of Education.  The segment stirred controversy among right-wing groups that frequently target Drag Queen Story Hour, and who took issue with her suggestion that “I think we might have some drag queens in training on our hands.”  PBS eventually took down the segment from its main website, however it is available on the local affiliate’s YouTube channel.

In May 2022, as Drag Queen Story Hour came under increased attacks from conservatives, Senator Marco Rubio specifically criticized Lil Miss Hot Mess’s Hips book referring to it as “sexually charged content.” In response, Lil Miss Hot Mess was outspoken in defending her work, describing these and similar remarks as “an attack not only on freedom of expression but on imagination,” and writing that, “if there is anything that drag performers and kids can learn from each other, it is to get in touch with one’s inner curiosity, conscience and creativity.”

Also in May 2022, Lil Miss Hot Mess published her second children’s book If You’re a Drag Queen and You Know It.

References

External links 
 
 Lil Miss Hot Mess books

American LGBT rights activists
American drag queens
American LGBT writers
Year of birth uncertain
Living people
1980s births
Pseudonymous women writers
21st-century American women writers
American women children's writers
21st-century pseudonymous writers